The first season of the American teen drama television series Gossip Girl premiered on The CW on September 19, 2007, and concluded on May 19, 2008, consisting of 18 episodes. Based on the novel series of the same name by Cecily von Ziegesar, the series was developed for television by Josh Schwartz and Stephanie Savage. It tells the story of Serena van der Woodsen's return to Manhattan's Upper East Side in New York City following her mysterious disappearance to boarding school in Connecticut, while being watched by gossip website Gossip Girl.

The first 13 episodes of Gossip Girl aired in the United States on Wednesdays at 9:00 p.m. on The CW, a terrestrial television network. With the exception of the 12th episode "School Lies", the first 13 episodes aired on the CTV Television Network in Canada one day prior to their US airdate. Following the 100-day writers strike, the remainder of the season aired on Mondays at 8:00 p.m. The season was released on DVD as a five-disc box set under the title of Gossip Girl: The Complete First Season on August 19, 2008, by Warner Home Video. The pilot episode was made available as a free download to registered users of the US iTunes Store prior to its premiere on television. Subsequent episodes became available to purchase following their original airing.

Plot
The return of "it girl" Serena van der Woodsen (Blake Lively) to the Upper East Side serves as the first season's focal point. Shrouded in mystery and scandal, Serena's disappearance and sudden return are announced by the omniscient blogger Gossip Girl. The news reaches Blair Waldorf (Leighton Meester) whose life is torn apart when the secret behind Serena's leaving is revealed: Serena was seduced by Nate Archibald (Chace Crawford), the Golden Boy of the Upper East Side and Blair's boyfriend, the night she left town. Nate announces his feelings for Serena a number of times and a series of battles ensue between the former Queen Bee Serena and her heir, Blair. However, the rift resolves in reconciliation between the two and temporary peace follows. Meanwhile, siblings Dan (Penn Badgley) and Jenny Humphrey (Taylor Momsen), Brooklyn residents, are attracted by the opulent wealth of their classmates. Young Jenny becomes a cunning protégée to Blair while Dan enters a relationship with Serena. It is revealed that their relationship resembles the one between Dan's father Rufus (Matthew Settle) and Serena's mother Lily (Kelly Rutherford) in their youth.

As a subplot, Blair and Nate suffer problems in their relationship when the dangerously seductive Chuck Bass (Ed Westwick) conquers Blair's fragile heart. The manipulative Georgina Sparks (Michelle Trachtenberg) arrives, creating a lot of trouble and revealing the real reason behind Serena's disappearance: a death Serena thought she was responsible for. When Georgina arrives on the Upper East Side she poses as a naive woman named Sarah in order to destroy Serena's newfound happiness. She succeeds in exposing Serena's deep-hidden secrets, taking Dan away from her and outing Serena's brother as gay. At the same time, Blair falls for Chuck, but as a price they both lose Nate. Not able to withstand the vulnerability a love relationship demands, Chuck leaves Blair.

In the midst of all these events, Dan greets Vanessa Abrams (Jessica Szohr) back to his life. Vanessa is a childhood friend of his and an outsider herself. She threatens his feelings for Serena, until he realizes the real love he has for her. At the end of the season, the Upper East Siders team up to banish Georgina from New York. Serena then leaves with Nate to the Hamptons, while Chuck abandons a heartbroken Blair. Dan reconciles with Vanessa and returns to his old life in Brooklyn. A disgraced Jenny departs Blair's clique and earns an internship as a fashion designer in a company owned by Blair's mother.

Cast and characters

Main cast
 Blake Lively as Serena van der Woodsen
 Leighton Meester as Blair Waldorf
 Penn Badgley as Dan Humphrey
 Chace Crawford as Nate Archibald
 Taylor Momsen as Jenny Humphrey
 Ed Westwick as Chuck Bass
 Jessica Szohr as Vanessa Abrams
 Kelly Rutherford as Lily van der Woodsen
 Matthew Settle as Rufus Humphrey
 Kristen Bell as Gossip Girl (uncredited)

Recurring cast
 Sam Robards as Howard Archibald
 Connor Paolo as Eric van der Woodsen
 Nicole Fiscella as Isabel Coates
 Nan Zhang as Kati Farkas
 Zuzanna Szadkowski as Dorota Kishlovsky
 Robert John Burke as Bart Bass
 Margaret Colin as Eleanor Waldorf
 Michelle Hurd as Laurel
 Jill Flint as Bex Simon
 Francie Swift as Anne Archibald
 Susan Misner as Alison Humphrey
 Amanda Setton as Penelope Shafai
 Dreama Walker as Hazel Williams

Guest cast
 Sebastian Stan as Carter Baizen
 John Shea as Harold Waldorf
 Caroline Lagerfelt as CeCe Rhodes
 William Abadie as Roman
 Linda Emond as Headmistress Queller
 Michelle Trachtenberg as Georgina Sparks
 Yin Chang as Nelly Yuki
 Jesse Swenson as Asher Hornsby

Episodes

Casting
The initial season had nine major roles receive star billing. Blake Lively portrayed initial protagonist Serena van der Woodsen, a former it girl of the Upper East Side, who returns from a mysterious stay at a boarding school in Connecticut, with Kelly Rutherford playing her mother Lily, a multiple-divorced socialite. Leighton Meester played Queen Bee, and the show's eventual protagonist, Blair Waldorf, who is less than happy to see her best friend return. Penn Badgley acted as middle-class outsider Dan Humphrey, with Matthew Settle playing his father Rufus, former rock star turned art dealer, and Taylor Momsen portraying his sister, Jenny, a freshman looking to fit in with the elite crowd at Constance Billiard. Chace Crawford portrayed Blair's boyfriend Nate Archibald, who has a thing for Serena. Ed Westwick played a womanizing player and 'bad boy' Chuck Bass. Originally only a guest star, Jessica Szohr starred as Dan's childhood best friend, Vanessa Abrams. Szohr gained a contract to the main cast list in the fourteenth episode.

Kristen Bell voiced "Gossip Girl", whose gossip commentary blog is widely visited by the youths of the Upper East Side social scene. Numerous supporting characters were given expansive and recurring appearances in the progressive storyline, including Connor Paolo who portrayed Serena's brother, Eric van der Woodsen, who had been placed into a rehab center following a suicide attempt. Margaret Colin acted as Blair's mother, Eleanor Waldorf, a fashion designer. Colin took over from Florencia Lozano who played the role in the pilot episode. Michelle Trachtenberg acts as Georgina Sparks, a girl from Serena's past who returns after escaping rehab in Utah. Sam Robards and Francie Swift portrayed Nate's parents Howard and Anne Archibald. Nicole Fiscella and Nan Zhang acted as Blair's loyal sidekicks Isabel Coates and Kati Farkas. Zhang left the series to study neuroscience at Johns Hopkins University with Serena explaining that Kati and her family had moved to Israel. Kati was replaced with the character of Nelly Yuki played by Yin Chang. Zhang would return to the show in season 4. Other members of Blair's clique include Amanda Setton as Penelope Shafai, Dreama Walker as Hazel Williams and Emma Demar as Elise Wells.

Other guest stars in recurring roles include Zuzanna Szadkowski as Blair's maid Dorota Kishlovsky, Robert John Burke as Chuck's father and billionaire Bart Bass, Susie Misner as Rufus' estranged wife Alison Humphrey and John Shea as Blair's father Harold Waldorf, with William Abadie as his partner Roman.

Crew
The season was produced by Warner Bros. Television, Alloy Entertainment and College Hill Pictures. The executive producers were creators Josh Schwartz and Stephanie Savage with Bob Levy and Leslie Morgenstein. K.J. Steinberg and Felicia D. Henderson served as co-executive producers. Producers include Joe Lazarov and Jessica Queller. The season was produced by Amy Kaufman. Jonathan C. Brody served as co-producer with Joshua Safran as consulting producer.

The staff writers were Schwartz, Savage, Henderson, Safran, Lenn K. Rosenfeld, Queller, Steinberg and Paul Sciarrotta. The regular directors throughout the season were Mark Piznarski, J. Miller Tobin, Patrick Norris, Norman Buckley, Tony Wharmby and Michael Fields.

Reception
Due to the show's pedigree as an adaptation of The New York Times bestselling novel series, the show was considered to be one of the more anticipated new shows of the 2007-2008 television season. An August 2007 survey by OTX, a global media research and consulting firm, placed the show on the list of top ten new shows that viewers were aware of. The pilot episode of the season gained 3.50 million viewers on its original airing, having previously been available as a free download on the American iTunes store. As the season progressed, ratings dropped with 2.48 million viewers tuning into the second episode. The eleventh episode marked a season low with only 1.81 million viewers tuning into watch the episode. The show was moved from Wednesdays at 9:00 p.m. to its new timeslot Mondays at 8:00 p.m following the end on the 2007–2008 Writers Guild of America strike where the final five episodes of the season were aired. Ratings increased for the season finale, with 3.00 million viewers tuning into the episode. Gossip Girl'''s digital video recorder ratings were high, increasing the show's profitability and the show had also been in the top five of iTunes sales.

Author Cecily von Ziegesar has expressed support for the show, noting that all of her major plot points were present in the pilot. The second episode in which the characters are shown to be attending a brunch gained some approval from New York magazine, stating that "there's no such thing as 'lunch' on the weekends", "that kids actually do venture outside of their neighborhoods" (since The New York Palace Hotel is in Midtown Manhattan), and "saying you live in Williamsburg makes much more sense... for real-estate emotional conflict", as well as the fact Rihanna is played "in every situation." Gossip Girl was designated the "Best. Show. Ever." in April 2008 by New York magazine. Other positive reviews came from publications Variety and the Boston Globe. John Maynard of The Washington Post felt that creator Josh Schwartz "turns it up a notch" from his former series The O.C., and cited Dan (Penn Badgley) as a standout character. Tim Goodman of the San Francisco Chronicle praised the show for its use of "Gossip Girl"'s blog as a new media element noting "there's a chance to tell a story where the Greek chorus essentially has a blog."

The show has come under criticism for containing scenes too risqué for its teen audience. The Parents Television Council (PTC) has shown particular criticism of the series, especially with its "OMFG" ad campaign used towards the end of the season in April 2008. It also named the episode "Victor, Victrola" the worst television program of the week in which the episode originally was broadcast. The Parents Council's negative comments include it being "the most-watched show among girls 12-17 and glamorizes casual sex and drug use among teens. [And that] storylines have featured a would-be teen rapist, threesome among teens, and teenage girls having sex with adults." Scott D. Pierce of the Deseret Morning News'' noted that the show is milder than a lot of what's shown on MTV, but still warned parents of several scenes in the pilot. He said it includes "among other things, a teenage girl climbing on top of a boy and removing his clothes; drunken teens having sex; teens smoking pot; teens drinking in bars, in a limo and at a party; a teen boy getting amorous with a girl who fights him off; and that same teen boy essentially attempting to rape a freshman girl who is supposed to be, what, 14?".

The series has also been criticized for having less-than believable storylines, and has been described as a guilty pleasure rather than an hour's worth of must-watch television.

DVD release
The DVD release of season one was released by Warner Home Video in the United States on August 19, 2008, after it had completed broadcast on television. As well as every episode from the season, the DVD release features bonus material including a downloadable audiobook, deleted scenes, and behind-the-scenes featurettes.

References

External links
 List of Gossip Girl season 1 episodes on IMDb

2007 American television seasons
2008 American television seasons